CYNE may refer to:

Norway House Airport, the IATA code for the airport in Canada
Cyne, an American hip hop group